Mary Wood may refer to:
Mary Ramsey Wood (died 1908), American pioneer
Mary Elizabeth Wood (1861–1931), American librarian and missionary
Mary Wood (baseball), AAGPBL player
Mary Antonia Wood (born 1959), American painter and sculptor
Mary Christina Wood, professor of law and author
Mary Evelyn Wood (1900–1978), politician and nurse in the Cayman Islands
Mary Knight Wood (1857–1944), American pianist, music educator and composer
Mary Myfanwy Wood (1882–1967), British missionary in China

See also
Mary Woods (disambiguation)
Wood (surname)